The Portland & Ogdensburg Railroad was a railroad planned to connect Portland, Maine to Ogdensburg, New York. The plan failed, and in 1880 the Vermont section was reorganized and leased by the Boston & Lowell Railroad. In 1886, the Maine and New Hampshire section was reorganized as the Portland & Ogdensburg Railway. That part was leased to the Maine Central Railroad in 1888, and in 1912 the Maine Central leased the eastern part of the Vermont section from the Boston & Maine Railroad, the successor to the B&L.

History
With the growth of the American Midwest and Upper Canada, transportation between those areas and the outside world became an issue.  The natural connector was the Great Lakes and St Lawrence River, but the river had rapids in some areas and froze in the winter.  Alternative transportation to an ice-free port by rail was possible, and Boston increased in importance as a result, but Boston's monopoly position proved bothersome to Great Lakes and especially Montreal interests, who began to look for alternatives.  Portland, Maine, was the most northerly ice-free port on the east coast of North America, and attracted attention as an outlet.  The problem was building a railroad from a lake or river port to Portland.  Montreal's solution was the St. Lawrence and Atlantic Railroad, but this left Great Lakes interests out.

The Portland & Ogdensburg Railroad was chartered on February 11, 1867 to run from Portland to Fabyan, a junction at Carroll, New Hampshire in the White Mountains, where the Boston, Concord & Montreal Railroad would continue west. In the summer of that year John Neal and other Portland business representatives traveled to Oswego, New York to determine the route's feasibility and determined it so. The two companies' track joined in a ceremony at the summit of Crawford Notch on August 7, 1875, then opened on August 16, 1875.

In 1864, the Essex County Railroad was chartered to run from St. Johnsbury, Vermont, on the Connecticut & Passumpsic Rivers Railroad, east to Lunenburg on the border with New Hampshire. The Montpelier & St. Johnsbury Railroad was chartered in 1866 to run west from St. Johnsbury to Montpelier. The Lamoille Valley Railroad was chartered in 1867 to run from West Danville on the planned M&SJ northwest to Swanton. The three companies were consolidated on August 7, 1875 to form the Vermont Division of the Portland & Ogdensburg Railroad, and the construction that had started was continued, except that the part of the M&SJ west of West Danville was never built.

Construction on the Vermont Division began in 1871, and was complete in 1877. To connect between the two divisions, the company at first used trackage rights over the Boston, Concord and Montreal Railroad from Fabyan to Dalton, New Hampshire, but soon built its own alignment. West of Swanton, the P&O was allied with the Ogdensburgh & Lake Champlain Railroad, running west from Rouses Point, New York to Ogdensburg, and used the Vermont & Canada Railroad to access it.

The Montreal, Portland & Boston Railway opened in 1876 from Montreal, Quebec to the national border, and was planned to continue into Vermont as a branch of the P&O.

Just after completion of the Vermont Division the company went bankrupt, was taken over by the receiver on October 19, 1877. The Vermont Division was reorganized as the St. Johnsbury & Lake Champlain Railroad on January 31, 1880. On August 9, 1882 the Montreal, Portland & Boston Railway leased it, but it was soon taken over by the Boston & Lowell Railroad.

The main division was reorganized on June 8, 1884 as the Portland & Ogdensburg Railway, and on August 20, 1888, the Maine Central Railroad leased it as their Mountain Division (some of which survives as the Conway Scenic Railroad, a heritage railroad). In July 1912, the Maine Central Railroad leased the old Vermont Division, but on August 1, 1927 the lease was terminated, and a new lease was made on only the part east of St. Johnsbury. The remainder of the Vermont Division operated as the St. Johnsbury & Lake Champlain Railroad until reorganized as the St. Johnsbury & Lamoille County Railroad in 1948.

Locomotives

References

 
 Railroad History Database
 Lamoille Valley Rail Corridor: A Brief History (DOC)

Defunct Maine railroads
Defunct New Hampshire railroads
Defunct Vermont railroads
Predecessors of the Maine Central Railroad
Railway companies established in 1886
Railway companies disestablished in 1943
American companies established in 1886